Charles Wilson Jones (29 April 1914 – 9 January 1986) was a Welsh international footballer who played as a centre forward for Wrexham, Birmingham (renamed Birmingham City in 1943) and Nottingham Forest in the Football League.

He was Birmingham's top scorer on three occasions in the First Division in the 1930s. He won two caps for Wales, the first on 27 March 1935 against Northern Ireland at the Racecourse Ground, Wrexham, when he scored the first goal in a 3–1 win, and the second on 20 May 1939, a 2–1 defeat against France in Paris.

He was landlord of the White Hart public house in Aston, Birmingham, for 19 years until it was demolished in 1968 prior to the construction of the Aston Expressway.

References
General
 

Specific

1914 births
1986 deaths
Footballers from Wrexham
Welsh footballers
Wales international footballers
Association football forwards
Wrexham A.F.C. players
Birmingham City F.C. players
Nottingham Forest F.C. players
Kidderminster Harriers F.C. players
English Football League players